Avcı is a Turkish given name and surname. Avcı or Avci may refer to:

Surname
 Abdullah Avcı (born 1963), Turkish football manager
 Gulan Avci (born 1977), Swedish politician 
 Koray Avcı (born 1979), Turkish footballer
 Mehmed Avci (1642–1693), Sultan of the Ottoman Empire
 Nabi Avcı (born 1953), Turkish academic and politician
 Sabit Osman Avcı (1921–2009), Turkish politician
 Sedef Avcı (born 1982), Turkish actress
 Serdar Avcı (born 1985), Turkish boxer
 Turgay Avcı (born 1959), Deputy Prime Minister and Minister of Foreign Affairs in the government of the Turkish Republic of Northern Cyprus
 Yasin Avcı (footballer born 1983), Turkish footballer
 Yasin Avcı (footballer born 1984), Turkish footballer

Places
 Avcı, Kemaliye

Turkish-language surnames